Heliosia perichares is a moth of the family Erebidae. It was described by Alfred Jefferis Turner in 1944. It is found in Australia, where it has been recorded from Queensland and New South Wales.

References

Nudariina
Moths described in 1944